Corinth is an unincorporated community in Randolph County, Alabama, United States, located  north of Wadley.

References

Unincorporated communities in Randolph County, Alabama
Unincorporated communities in Alabama